Nešković (Cyrillic script: Нешковић) is a Serbian surname. It may refer to:

Blagoje Nešković (1907–1984), Yugoslav partisan and politician
Đorđe Nešković (born 1991), Serbian curler
Nikola Nešković (c.1729–1785), painter
Wolfgang Nešković (born 1948), German politician

Serbian surnames